= Thandiwe Sithole =

South African chemical engineer and academic

Thandiwe Nastassia Sithole is a South African chemical engineer and academic at the University of Johannesburg. She is an associate professor in the Department of Chemical Engineering and has served as Vice Dean for Global Engagement in the Faculty of Engineering and the Built Environment. Her research focuses on environmental and chemical engineering, particularly the utilisation of industrial waste, circular and green economy approaches, waste valorisation, geopolymer materials, and wastewater treatment methods.

== Early life and education ==
Thandiwe Sithole was born in Rabokala near Soshanguve in Pretoria, South Africa. She studied engineering in South Africa and later completed a PhD in Chemical Engineering. She also obtained a postgraduate qualification in higher education.

== Academic career ==
She joined the University of Johannesburg in 2016, where she has worked in teaching and administrative roles within the Faculty of Engineering and the Built Environment. She later served as Vice Dean for Global Engagement and has taken part in academic administration and postgraduate supervision.

Her academic work includes studies related to industrial waste reuse and wastewater treatment in engineering contexts. She has also served on national academic evaluation activities, including the engineering and technology research output evaluation subpanel of the South African Department of Higher Education and Training. She was the Chairperson of the technical advisory committee of the Platinum Incubator

== Research ==
Thandiwe Sithole’s research addresses environmental engineering issues involving industrial waste and water pollution, including the use of waste-derived materials and methods for treating contaminated water.

== Professional affiliations ==
- Engineering Council of South Africa (candidate chemical engineering technologist).
- Editorial board member, Frontiers in Environmental Chemistry.
- Associate Editor, Journal of Smart and Green Materials
- Member at the Early Career Editorial Board of the Chemical Engineering Journal
- Guest Editor, Springer Book

== Selected publications ==
- Sithole, T.; Mashifana, T.; Mahlangu, D.; Tchadjie, L. (2021). Physical, Chemical and Geotechnical Characterization of Wet Flue Gas Desulfurization Gypsum and Its Potential Application as Building Materials. Buildings.
- Sithole, T.; Jobodwana, L.; Magedi, F. (2025). Solidification of Landfill Leachates Using Alkali-Activated Slag. Topics in Catalysis.
- Sithole, T., 2026. Optimization of cleaner masonry blocks: response surface methodology and genetic algorithm integrated neural networks in the applications of slag and waste sand. Results in Engineering, p.108753.
- Letsoalo, M. R.; Sithole, T.; Mufamadi, S.; Mazhandu, Z.; Sillanpää, M.; Kaushik, A.; Mashifana, T. (2023). Efficient detection and treatment of pharmaceutical contaminants to produce clean water for better health and environment. Journal of Cleaner Production.
- Sithole, T. (2023). Elevated Temperature Basic Oxygen Furnace Slag Stabilisation of Desilicated Foundry Sand. Key Engineering Materials.
- Sithole, T. (2024). Mitigation of Efflorescence and Alkali Leaching in Activated Slag Using Foundry Sand. Key Engineering Materials.
- Mvita, M.; Sithole, T. (2025). Nanostructured functionalised sewage sludge adsorbent: Optimising wastewater remediation using ANN and RSM. Journal of Nanostructure in Chemistry.
